The 2020 Iranian Super Cup was the 6th Iranian Super Cup, an annual football match played between the winners of the previous season's Persian Gulf Pro League, Persepolis, and the previous season's Hazfi Cup, Tractor.

Persepolis were the defending champions as winners of the 2019 Iranian Super Cup, and defended their title.

Teams

Match

Summary

Details

Gallery

References

Iranian Super Cup
Iranian Super Cup, 2020
Persepolis F.C. matches
2020